Molasses is a viscous substance resulting from refining sugarcane or sugar beets into sugar. Molasses varies in the amount of sugar, method of extraction and age of the plant. Sugarcane molasses is primarily used to sweeten and flavour foods. Molasses is a major constituent of fine commercial brown sugar. It is also one of the primary ingredients used to distill rum.

Sweet sorghum syrup is colloquially called sorghum molasses in the southern United States. Molasses has a stronger flavour and is more viscous than most alternative syrups.

Name
The word molasses comes from melaço in Portuguese, a derivative (intensifier) of mel (honey) with Latinate roots. Cognates include Ancient Greek μέλι (méli) (honey), Latin mel, Spanish melaza (molasses), Romanian miere or melasă, and French miel (honey).

Cane molasses

Cane molasses is an ingredient used in baking and cooking. It was popular in the Americas before the 20th century, when it was plentiful and commonly used as a sweetener in foods and an ingredient in brewing beer in the colonies. George Washington had a notebook that contains a molasses beer recipe.

To produce molasses, sugar cane is harvested and stripped of leaves. Its juice is then extracted, usually by cutting, crushing or mashing. The juice is boiled to produce a concentrate and encourage sugar crystallization. The result of this first boiling is called first syrup ('A' Molasses) and has the highest sugar content. First syrup is usually referred to in the Southern United States as cane syrup rather than molasses. Second molasses ('B' Molasses) is produced by a second boiling and sugar extraction and has a slightly bitter taste.

Boiling the sugar syrup a third-time yields dark, viscous blackstrap molasses ('C' Molasses), known for its robust flavour. During this process, the majority of sucrose from the original juice is crystallized and removed. The caloric content of blackstrap molasses is mostly a result of the small amount of remaining sugar content.

Unlike highly refined sugars, molasses contains significant amounts of vitamin B6 and minerals, including calcium, magnesium, iron and manganese; one tablespoon provides up to 20% of the recommended daily value of each of those nutrients. Blackstrap is also a good source of potassium.

The bitterness of blackstrap molasses is much greater than in the regular form of molasses. It is sometimes used in baking or to produce ethanol, as an ingredient in cattle feed, or as a fertilizer.

The exaggerated health benefits sometimes claimed for blackstrap molasses were the theme of the 1951 novelty song Black Strap Molasses, recorded by Groucho Marx, Jimmy Durante, Jane Wyman and Danny Kaye.

Madeira Island 
In Madeira Island cane molasses is a big part of the traditional cuisine, where it is known as mel-de-cana (Portuguese for "sugarcane honey"). Its origin on the Autonomous Regions dates back its origins to the golden age of sugar production in the archipelago.

Sugar beet molasses
Molasses made from sugar beet differs from sugarcane molasses. Only the syrup remaining from the final crystallization stage is referred to as molasses. Intermediate syrups are referred to as high green and low green molasses, and these are recycled at crystallization plants to maximize extraction. Beet molasses is 50% sugar by dry weight, predominantly sucrose, but contains significant amounts of glucose and fructose. Beet molasses is limited in biotin (vitamin H or B7) for cell growth and hence may be supplemented with a biotin source. The non-sugar content includes many salts, including calcium, potassium, oxalate and chloride. It contains betaine and the trisaccharide raffinose. These result from the concentration of the original plant material or other chemicals in processing and are unpalatable to humans. It is therefore mainly used as an animal feed additive (known as molassed sugar beet feed) or a fermentation feedstock.

Additional sugar can also be extracted from beet molasses in a process known as desugarization. The process employs industrial-scale chromatography to separate sucrose from non-sugar components. The technique is economically viable in trade-protected areas, where the price of sugar is supported above market price. As such, it is practised in the U.S. and parts of Europe. Sugar beet molasses is widely consumed in Europe (for example Germany, where it is known as Zuckerrübensirup). Molasses is also used in yeast production.

Fruit molasses

Pomegranate molasses 

Pomegranate molasses is a traditional ingredient in Middle Eastern cooking. It is made by simmering a mixture of pomegranate juice, sugar and lemon juice and reducing the mixture for about an hour until the consistency of syrup is achieved.

Unsulfured molasses
Many types of molasses on the market are branded unsulfured. In the past, many foods, including molasses, were treated with a sulfur dioxide preservative, helping to kill off moulds and bacteria. Sulfur dioxide is also used as a bleaching agent to help lighten the colour of molasses. Most brands have abandoned the use of sulfur dioxide in molasses because untreated molasses already has a relatively stable natural shelf life. Poor flavour and the trace toxicity of low doses of sulfur dioxide are also factors that have led to the removal of its use.

Nutrition

Molasses is composed of 22% water, 75% carbohydrates and very small amounts (0.1%) of fat (table). It contains no protein. In a reference amount of 100 grams, molasses is a rich source (20% or more of the Daily Value, DV) of vitamin B6 and several dietary minerals, including manganese, magnesium, iron, potassium and calcium (table).

The sugars in molasses are sucrose (29% of total carbohydrates), glucose (12%) and fructose (13%) (data from USDA nutrition table).

Other uses

Food products and additives
The uses of molasses in food production may include:

 Principal ingredient in the distillation of rum
 Production of dark rye bread
 Production of gingerbread (particularly in the Americas)
 Production of barbecue sauces 
 Some brown sugar is made by combining molasses with white sugar
 In some beer styles of stouts and porters
 Stabilization of emulsifiers in home-made vinaigrette 
 Additive in mu'assel (also known as shisha), the tobacco smoked in a hookah

Industrial
 As a minor component of mortar for brickwork
 Mixed with gelatin glue and glycerine in casting composition ink rollers on early printing presses

Horticultural
 As a soil additive to promote microbial activity, resulting in increased production of succinic acid, malic acid, butyric acid and mannitol. Production of these common plant defensive chemicals by microbes is believed to aid in suppressing plant disease.

See also

 Anadama bread
 Caramelization
 Corn syrup
 Great Molasses Flood
 Inverted sugar syrup
 Jaggery
 Kuromitsu
 Maillard reaction
 Maple syrup
 Muscovado
 Pekmez
 Shoofly pie

References

External links
 

 
Biofuels
Sugars
Syrup